Bo Sundqvist (born 21 September 1941) is a Swedish physicist and former rector magnificus of Uppsala University. 

Sundqvist was educated at Uppsala University, where he received his PhD in Nuclear Physics. He was appointed professor of Ion physics in 1987, and elected rector magnificus in 1997, a position he held until his retirement on 30 June 2006. He was president of the Association of Swedish Higher Education, a co-operative body for more than 40 institutions of higher education in Sweden, in 2005–2006.

He is a member of the Royal Swedish Academy of Sciences, and was the president of the academy from 1 July 2006 until 30 June 2009. He is also a member of the Royal Swedish Academy of Engineering Sciences, the Royal Society of Sciences in Uppsala, and the Royal Danish Academy of Sciences and Letters.

References

Swedish physicists
Rectors of Uppsala University
Members of the Royal Swedish Academy of Sciences
1941 births
Living people
Members of the Royal Society of Sciences in Uppsala